Dupuch may refer to:

People with the surname
Antoine-Adolphe Dupuch (1800–1856), French Roman Catholic priest.
Étienne Dupuch (1899–1991), Bahamian journalist.
Joël Dupuch, French oyster farmer.